As the viceregal representative of the monarch of Canada, the lieutenant governors of the Canadian provinces have since Confederation been entitled to and have used a personal standard. Within a lieutenant governor's province, this standard has precedence over any other flag, including the national one, though it comes secondary to the Queen's Canadian Royal Standard. The provincial viceregal flags are also subordinate to the governor general's personal standard, save for when the governor general is present as a guest of the lieutenant governor.

In 1980, a new design was introduced and is used by each province's lieutenant governor, except for Quebec and Nova Scotia. Common frame of each flag consists of the escutcheon of the arms of the province circled with ten gold maple leaves (representing the ten provinces) surmounted by a St. Edward's Crown on a field of blue. Though approved in 1980, most provinces adopted this new common design in 1981, with Newfoundland being the last in 1987. The personal standard is flown at the office or home of the lieutenant governor and from flagpoles of buildings where official duties are carried out to indicate presence of the lieutenant governor. It is also attached to the front fender of the car or on the provincial landau that the lieutenant governor is riding in. The standard is never flown on a church or inside a church, nor is it ever lowered to half-mast. Should a lieutenant governor die while in office, the standard is taken down until a successor is sworn in.

Current

Historical

For the other provinces many of them used a defaced Union Jack with the vice-regal arms in the centre.

See also

Flag of the governor general of Canada
List of Canadian flags
Royal standards of Canada

References

 Lieutenant Governors' Flags – Canadian Heritage website

Lieutenant Governors
Canada